The International Racquetball Federation's 19th Racquetball World Championships were held in San José, Costa Rica from August 10–18, 2018. Originally, the event was to be held in Haining, China, but on March 17, 2018 the IRT announced via its Facebook page that the venue will be changed due to complications. Cali, Colombia was the first alternative choice, but there were complications there as well, so on June 16, 2018, the IRF announced via Facebook that San Jose, Costa Rica will host Worlds.

Rodrigo Montoya of Mexico won men's singles for the first time, defeating the USA's Charlie Pratt in the final. In Women's singles, Gabriela Martinez of Guatemala upset the three-time defending champion Mexican Paola Longoria to win gold. In doubles, Alvaro Beltran and Daniel De La Rosa won men's doubles in three games over Rocky Carson and Sudsy Monchik of the US, and Bolivians Valeria Centellas and Yasmine Sabja became the first women from South America to win Women's doubles after defeating Mexicans Alexandra Herrera and Monserrat Mejia in a three-game final.

2018 was the first year the USA did not win a gold medal at Worlds. On five occasions the USA swept the gold medals in men's and women's singles and doubles: 1981, 1992, 1996, 2004, 2008. Also, 2018 was the third time that three countries won a gold medal at Worlds; that first happened in 2006 and 2014.

Tournament format
The 2018 World Championships used a two-stage format to determine the World Champions. Initially, players competed in separate groups over three days. The results were used to seed players for an elimination round. Thus, there was no team competition. Team standings were based on points earned from the singles and doubles competitions.

Medal table

Events

Men's singles

Women's singles

Men's doubles

Women's doubles

Team results

References

External links
IRF website

 
World Championships
Racquetball World Championships
Racquetball World Championships
Sports competitions in San José, Costa Rica
International sports competitions hosted by Costa Rica
August 2018 sports events in North America